Paolo Hernán Dellafiore (born 2 February 1985) is an Argentine-born Italian footballer, who plays as a central defender for Serie D club Mantova.

Club career

Internazionale
Born in Buenos Aires to Italian parents, Dellafiore started his professional career with Internazionale. Dellafiore had played for Inter since the 1999–2000 season and was promoted to the   Primavera team, during the 2002–03 season. He made his debut with the nerazzurri in a UEFA Champions League match against R.S.C. Anderlecht, on 7 December 2004. He then spent two seasons on loan to Serie C1's Spezia (with Riccardo Meggiorini) and Serie A's Treviso.

Palermo
In 2006, he was sold to Palermo for €1.5 million as part of the deal that brought Fabio Grosso to Inter for (€6.5M). Dellafiore managed seven appearances in his first season with the rosanero. He was then loaned to Torino for €100,000 (with option to purchase), where he had the opportunity to play more regularly, before being called back to Sicily in June 2008 (which Palermo paid Torino €400,000 to counter the buy option). Dellafiore signed a five-year contract during the 2008–09 season, but on 14 January 2009 turned back to Torino F.C. on loan for €400,000. After 6 months with Torino, Torino president Urbano Cairo announced that Dellafiore will play for Palermo for 2009–2010 after the team was relegated.

Parma (loan)
On 3 July 2009, Parma signed Dellafiore on loan from Palermo, for €250,000, with an option to sign half of the rights for €1.75 million. After the end of the season, Dellafiore returned to Sicily, but was later loaned out again to Parma on 20 August 2010, for free with an option to sign half of the rights for €400,000. He was sub-loaned to Cesena on 7 January 2011, for €200,000.

Parma & Novara
In August 2011 he was permanently transferred to Parma F.C., for free. In the same month he moved to Serie A newcomers Novara Calcio for a peppercorn of €500, in co-ownership deal. In May 2012 Dellafiore returned to Internazionale for its Indonesia friendly tour in a 1-month loan. In June 2012 Dellafiore returned to Parma for €250,000, which also cost Parma an additional €200,000 as other fee.

Siena
In late June to 1 July 2012, Dellafiore was involved in 8-men swap with Siena, which saw Coppola, Dellafiore, Doumbia and Galuppo went to Siena, with Brandão, Pacini, Rossi and Iacobucci went to Parma. Non of the new players actually played for Parma, only able to bring financial success to both clubs.

Dellafiore himself failed to play regularly for Siena in Serie A, only able to play twice before left for his first Serie B club Padova in temporary deal. At the end of season Siena relegated, which Dellafiore followed the club for the new season.

Dellafiore made his best season with Siena in 2013–14 Serie B, in terms of total appearances of 35 Serie B games. At the end of season the co-ownership between Siena and Parma was renewed again, however Siena was expelled from Serie B due to financial difficulties. Dellafiore became a free agent soon after.

Latina
On 23 July 2014, Dellafiore was signed by Serie B club Latina along with former Siena team-mate Ângelo, Farelli and Valiani. He left the club in June 2017 after the club was relegated to Serie D for bankruptcy.

Perugia
On 12 January 2018, he was signed by Serie B club Perugia after six months of inactivity.

Paganese
On 5 February 2019, after sitting out another half-year without a club, he signed with Serie C club Paganese. He left the club by the end of the season.

In August 2019, he accepted to return to Palermo on trial, after the club was refounded and forced to restart from Serie D. He was however not offered a contract by the end of the pre-season training camp.

Mantova
Dellafiore ended up joining Serie D club Mantova on 6 December 2019, signing a deal until the end of the season.

International career
Although born in Argentina, Dellafiore chose to represent Italy at international level and was capped for Italian junior teams a few times.

He made his Italy U21 debut on 11 October 2005 against Moldova U21, he received his second cap for the Olympic team (de facto U21 team) at 2008 Toulon Tournament.

Footnotes

References

External links
 
 Profile at US Palermo
 Profile at FIGC 
 Lega Serie A
 Lega Serie B 

1985 births
Living people
Footballers from Buenos Aires
Association football central defenders
Italian footballers
Italy under-21 international footballers
Italy youth international footballers
Serie A players
Serie B players
Serie C players
Serie D players
Inter Milan players
Spezia Calcio players
Treviso F.B.C. 1993 players
Palermo F.C. players
Torino F.C. players
Parma Calcio 1913 players
A.C. Cesena players
Novara F.C. players
A.C.N. Siena 1904 players
Calcio Padova players
Latina Calcio 1932 players
A.C. Perugia Calcio players
Mantova 1911 players
Paganese Calcio 1926 players
Citizens of Italy through descent
Argentine people of Italian descent
Italian Argentine